Hideous Kinky is a 1998 drama directed by Scottish director Gillies MacKinnon. Based on Esther Freud's semi-autobiographical 1992 novel of the same name, it follows a young English mother who moves from London to Morocco with her two young daughters in the early 70s. The film stars Kate Winslet and French-Moroccan actor Saïd Taghmaoui. The soundtrack mixes original music with songs from the 60s, including tracks from Canned Heat, Richie Havens and The Incredible String Band.

Plot
In 1972, disenchanted about the dreary conventions of English life, 25-year-old Julia (Winslet) heads for Morocco with her daughters, six-year-old Lucy and eight-year-old Bea. Living in a low-rent Marrakech hotel, the trio survive on the sale of hand-sewn dolls and money from the girls' father, a London poet who also has a child from another woman.

After the girls match their mother with gentle Moroccan acrobat and conman Bilal, sexual gears are set in motion. He eventually moves in with them and serves as a surrogate father. Julia's friend Eva urges Julia to study in Algiers with a revered Sufi master at a school of "the annihilation of the ego". In another sequence, European dandy Santoni invites Julia and the girls to his villa. As finances dwindle, Bilal's philosophy is "God will provide", although usually it is Bilal himself who provides. Sometimes he also disappears. At one point Bea contracts a streptococcus infection while he is gone and nearly dies. Bilal returns only to disappear again, but he has a plan. They discover that three return tickets that suddenly appear have been bought by him with money he got from the sale of his uniform. In the end, Julia and the girls board a train back to London.

Reception
Kate Winslet's performance won praise from many reviewers. In Entertainment Weekly, Lisa Schwartzbaum argued that Winslet "perfectly projects that naive self-centeredness with which a Woodstock generation of young wanderers, seeking spiritual revelation, made their way to cultures as exotic as their thumbs could take them". In Variety, critic Lisa Nesselson also praised the "radiant" and "sturdy" Winslet for her performance, and argued that the film was "filtered through a sober and intelligent artistic eye". Rolling Stone reviewer Craig Mathieson called the film "a compelling authentic journey".

Main cast

 Kate Winslet as Julia
 Saïd Taghmaoui as Bilal
 Bella Riza as Bea
 Carrie Mullan as Lucy
 Pierre Clémenti as Santoni
 Sira Stampe as Eva
 Abigail Cruttenden as Charlotte
 Amidou as Sufi Sheikh
 Michelle Fairley as Patricia

References

External links
 
 
 

1998 films
1998 drama films
1998 independent films
British drama films
British independent films
1990s Arabic-language films
Films about sisters
Films based on biographies
Films set in Morocco
Films set in the 1970s
Films directed by Gillies MacKinnon
1990s English-language films
1998 multilingual films
British multilingual films
1990s British films